Dynamin-1 is a protein that in humans is encoded by the DNM1 gene.

Function 

This gene encodes a member of the dynamin subfamily of GTP-binding proteins. The encoded protein possesses unique mechanochemical properties used to tubulate and sever membranes, and is involved in clathrin-mediated endocytosis and other vesicular trafficking processes. Actin and other cytoskeletal proteins act as binding partners for the encoded protein, which can also self-assemble leading to stimulation of GTPase activity. More than sixty highly conserved copies of the 3' region of this gene are found elsewhere in the genome, particularly on chromosomes Y and 15. Alternatively spliced transcript variants encoding different isoforms have been described.

Role in disease 
De novo mutations in DNM1 have been associated with a severe form of childhood epilepsy called developmental and epileptic encephalopathy. Most pathogenic variants are missense variants, and have been shown to impair synaptic vesicle endocytosis in a dominant negative manner.

Interactions 

DNM1 has been shown to interact with:

 AMPH, 
 FNBP1, 
 Grb2 
 NCK1, 
 PACSIN1,  and
 SH3GL2.

References

Further reading